The 1877 Great Grimsby by-election was fought on 1 August 1877.  The byelection was fought due to the death of the incumbent Conservative MP, John Chapman.  It was won by the Liberal candidate Alfred Watkin.

References

Politics of Grimsby
1877 elections in the United Kingdom
1877 in England
19th century in Lincolnshire
August 1877 events
By-elections to the Parliament of the United Kingdom in Lincolnshire constituencies